GTLK (ГТЛК; English: State Transport Leasing Company) is Russia's largest leasing company. Its offices are in Salekhard, Yamalo-Nenets Autonomous Okrug, Russia. 

In April 2022, GTLK was added to the British government's and EU sanctions lists, in relation to the 2022 Russian invasion of Ukraine.

References

External links 
 

Companies based in Yamalo-Nenets Autonomous Okrug
Leasing companies
2001 establishments in Russia